New World is a reality show produced by Netflix starring Lee Seung-gi, Eun Ji-Won, Kim Hee-chul, Jo Bo-ah, Park Na-rae, Kai. It was released by Netflix on November 20, 2021.

Synopsis

The show is an unprecedented imaginary simulation variety show, portraying a utopia that everyone dreams of. Unpredictable events happen every now and then here.

The members of the show will be facing various survival tasks, duels and twist. Six variety entertainers were invited to come to the imaginary world to realize their dreams, incorporating mysterious concepts that can only be found in movies or fairy tales.

Filming
The crew was spotted filming the show starting from May 27, 2021, and it lasted for six days.

The filming took place on an island in Geoje, South Gyeongsang Province. The entire island is famous for its garden, Oedo Botania Park.

Release
On September 25, 2021, the first teaser for the show was released along with the announcement that it will premiere on November 20.

Reception
The series entered the Top 10 most viewed Netflix shows in 6 countries. It ranked 8th in South Korea, and 5th in Indonesia, Singapore and Malaysia. In addition, it ranked 6th in Vietnam and 7th in Hong Kong, proving the global popularity of 'From the New World'.

Awards

References

External links
 

Netflix original documentary television series
South Korean variety television shows
Korean-language Netflix original programming